Pētersala-Andrejsala is a neighbourhood of Riga, the capital of Latvia.

It is located near the Freeport of Riga and consists of the areas of Pētersala and Andrejsala.

Neighbourhoods in Riga